Artem Sitalo (born 1 August 1989) is a Ukrainian professional footballer who plays as a midfielder for Inhulets Petrove.

Sitalo is a product of the FC Osvita Kherson youth system. In 2009, he joined FC Krystal Kherson before the club's return to professional football. In Krystal, Sitalo was a captain and a leading attacking player. In 2014 he moved to FC Hirnyk Kryvyi Rih.

References

External links
 

1989 births
Living people
Ukrainian footballers
FC Krystal Kherson players
FC Zirka Kropyvnytskyi players
FC Hirnyk Kryvyi Rih players
FC Oleksandriya players
FC Inhulets Petrove players
Sportspeople from Kherson
Ukrainian Premier League players
Association football midfielders